Nikita Konstantinovich Kalugin (born 12 March 1998) is a Russian football player who plays as centre back for FC Neftekhimik Nizhnekamsk.

Club career
He made his debut in the Russian Professional Football League for FC Dynamo-2 Moscow on 28 July 2016 in a game against FC Domodedovo Moscow.

He made his debut in the Russian Premier League for PFC Sochi on 13 July 2019 in a game against FC Spartak Moscow.

International
He represented Russia national under-17 football team in the 2015 UEFA European Under-17 Championship.

Career statistics

Club

References

External links
 
 Profile by Russian Professional Football League

1998 births
Sportspeople from Kostroma Oblast
Living people
Russian footballers
Russia youth international footballers
Russia under-21 international footballers
Association football defenders
FC Dynamo Moscow players
PFC Sochi players
FC Neftekhimik Nizhnekamsk players
Russian Premier League players
Russian First League players
Russian Second League players